Southern Pacific 1293 is an S-14 class 0-6-0 steam locomotive built by Lima Locomotive Works. It was dedicated to the City of Tracy, California, on August 8, 1958, by the Southern Pacific Railroad Company (now Union Pacific Railroad).

Current status
After Southern Pacific retired 1293 in 1957, SP donated the locomotive for display in Dr. Powers Park in Tracy, California. It remains there to this day on static display, subject to deterioration caused by vandalism and exposure to weather.

See also
 List of preserved Southern Pacific Railroad rolling stock
 Southern Pacific 1215

References

External links
 Southern Pacific #1293 (Railtown Tracy)

1263
Preserved steam locomotives of California
Lima locomotives
0-6-0 locomotives
Standard gauge locomotives of the United States
Railway locomotives introduced in 1924